Mufti Azizul Haq (1903 — 1961) was an Islamic scholar and social reformer from present-day Bangladesh. He was the founder of Al-Jamiah al-Islamiyyah Patiya and served as its first chancellor.

Early life and education 
Azizul Haq was born in 1903, to a Bengali Muslim family of Munshis in Charkanai, Patiya of the Bengal Presidency's Chittagong District. He lost his father, Mawlānā Nur Ahmad, at the age of eleven months. Haq also lost his mother when he turned eleven years old. From then on, he was raised by his paternal grandfather, Munshi Surat Ali.

In 1914, his grandfather took him to Al-Jamiah al-Arabiyyah al-Islamiyyah Jiri where he entrusted him under the supervision of its director Shah Ahmad Hasan.

On the same year in which Haq completed Meshkat, Hasan declared that the madrasa shall be establishing a Hadith department the following year. In 1924, Haq completed his Hadith studies at Jiri and set off for Hindustan for further education. He studied in Darul Uloom Deoband and Mazahir Uloom, both in Saharanpur district. He returned to Bengal after spending nine months under Ashraf Ali Thanwi.

Career 
Haq returned to Jiri, serving as the madrasa's mufti and mufassir (scholar of Quranic exegesis) from 1927 to 1940. With the patronage of his teacher Zamiruddin Ahmad, Haq established a madrasa named Zamiria Qasimul Uloom in 1938. It later came to be known as al-Jamia al-Islamiyyah Patiya and was upgraded into an Islamic university. He spent the rest of his life as the chancellor of this madrasa.

Personal life 
During his time as teacher at the Jiri Madrasa, Haq married the daughter of Badiur Rahman Saudagar of Harinkhain (West Patiya). In this marriage, they had three sons and four daughters.

Death 

Haq died just before the Friday prayer of 3 March 1961, at the age of 63. His janaza (funeral prayer) was performed by the Abdul Karim Madani (Imam of Anderkilla Shahi Jame Mosque) at the Jamia Patiya ground. Haq was subsequently buried in the madrasa graveyard, which is now known as Maqbara-e-Azizi.

References

Further reading 
 
 
 
 
 Tazkira-e-Aziz, Sultan Zauq Nadvi
 Yaad-e-Aziz
 

20th-century Muslim scholars of Islam
Hanafi fiqh scholars
Sunni Muslim scholars of Islam
Mazahir Uloom alumni
Darul Uloom Deoband alumni
Deobandis
1903 births
1961 deaths
20th-century Bengalis
Bengali Muslim scholars of Islam
Muftis
Director general of Al Jamia Al Islamia Patiya